Samarium arsenide is a binary inorganic compound of samarium and arsenic with the chemical formula .

Synthesis
Heating of pure substances in vacuum:
 Sm + As -> SmAs

Physical properties
Samarium arsenide forms crystals of a cubic system, space group Fm3m, cell parameters a = 0.5921 nm, Z = 4, of NaCl-structure.

The compound melts congruently at 2257 °C.

Uses
SmAs is used as a semiconductor and in photo optic applications.

References

Arsenides
Samarium compounds
Semiconductor materials
Rock salt crystal structure